The Women's points race event of the 2016 UCI Track Cycling World Championships was held on 5 March 2016. Katarzyna Pawłowska of Poland won the gold medal.

Results
100 laps (25 km) were raced with 10 sprints.

References

Women's points race
UCI Track Cycling World Championships – Women's points race